Sundown Beach is a 1948 play in two acts by American playwright Bessie Breuer. Directed by Elia Kazan, the play opened on Broadway at the Belasco Theatre on September 7, 1948, closing after seven performances on September 11, 1948. The cast notably included Julie Harris who won a Theatre World Award for her portrayal of Ida Mae, and Cloris Leachman in her Broadway debut.

References

External links
 

1948 plays
American plays
Broadway plays

(characters)

Hazel
Vanilla
Nona
Nancy
Ida Mae
Helen
Muriel
Ella
Otis
Walters
Cecil
Thad
George
Arthur